Janne Nilsson (1882–1938) was a Swedish politician who was a member of the Parliament and the minister of defense between 1936 and 1938.

Biography
Nilsson was born in Hörby on 17 May 1882. He was a member of the Agrarian Party. He was appointed minister of defense in the coalition government led by Prime Minister Per Albin Hansson on 19 June 1936.

He died of cerebral hemorrhage in Stockholm on 9 December 1938 while serving as the minister of defense. His successor was a social democratic politician Edvin Sköld.

References

External links

1882 births
1938 deaths
Members of the Riksdag from the Centre Party (Sweden)
People from Hörby Municipality
Swedish Ministers for Defence